Koutouan is a surname. Notable people with the surname include:

 Adrienne Koutouan (born 1969), Ivorian comedian and actress
 Antonin Koutouan (born 1983), Ivorian footballer
 Michaela Koutouan (born 1990), Ivorian footballer
 Vanessa Koutouan (born 1988), Ivorian women's rights activist